Winter Sun Crying is a live album by American jazz bassist William Parker with the German ICI Ensemble which was recorded as part of their Composer in Dialogue series in 2009 and released on the NEOS Jazz label.

Reception

In his review for AllMusic, arwulf arwulf states "Winter Sun Crying may be enjoyed among the freest of William Parker's many imaginatively conceived and fully liberated recordings".

Track listing
All compositions by William Parker & the ICI Ensemble
 "Bells" - 8:10  
 "Train" - 2:59  
 "Winter Sun Crying" - 4:24  
 "Earth" - 3:12  
 "Moon" - 5:04  
 "Orphans" - 4:37  
 "Explosion" - 2:48  
 "Tears" - 3:03  
 "Hope" - 2:36  
 "Sky" - 3:14  
 "Grandmother" - 2:12  
 "Circle" - 4:00  
 "Hello" - 3:02  
 "Revolution" - 6:56  
 "Let's Change The World" - 6:39

Personnel
William Parker - bass, piccolo trumpet, shakuhachi, double reeds
David Jäger - soprano saxophone, tenor saxophone
Roger Jannotta - alto saxophone, piccolo, flute, clarinet 
Markus Heinze - baritone saxophone, tenor saxophone
Christofer Varner - trombone, sampler 
Johanna Varner - cello 
Martin Wolfrum - piano, keyboard 
Gunnar Geisse - laptop, laptop guitar 
Georg Janker - double bass, G2 
Sunk Pöschl - drums

References

2011 live albums
William Parker (musician) live albums